Ensitrelvir, sold under the brand name Xocova is an antiviral medication used as a treatment for COVID-19. It was developed by Shionogi in partnership with Hokkaido University and acts as an orally active 3C-like protease inhibitor. It is taken by mouth.

The most common adverse events include transient decreases in high-density lipoprotein and increases blood triglycerides.

Medical uses 
Ensitrelvir is indicated for the treatment of COVID-19.

History
Ensitrelvir has reached Phase III clinical trials. The Japanese government is reportedly considering allowing Shionogi permission to apply for approval for medical use before the final steps of trials are completed, potentially speeding up the release for sale. This conditional early approval system has previously been used in Japan to accelerate the progression to market of other antiviral drugs targeting COVID-19, including remdesivir and molnupiravir. In a study of 428 patients, viral load was reduced, but symptoms were not significantly reduced.

In February 2022, the company sought emergency approval from regulators in Japan.

Shionogi announced they had reached a preliminary agreement to supply 1million doses to the Japanese government once the drug is approved. The CEO said they could have capacity to make 10million doses a year.

Society and culture

Legal status 
Ensitrelvir was approved for emergency use in Japan in November 2022.

Names 
Ensitrelvir is the International nonproprietary name.

References

External links 
 

COVID-19 drug development
Fluoroarenes
Indazoles
Chloroarenes
SARS-CoV-2 main protease inhibitors
Triazoles